The  was a trade union for bakers in Argentina. It was founded in 1887 by Italian anarchist labor organizer .

Establishment 
The  was founded in Buenos Aires on August 4, 1887, by Italian anarchist labor organizer Ettore Mattei. The statutes for the union were drafted by Errico Malatesta, another Italian anarchist. It was the first bakers' union in Argentina, and the country's first society based around the principles of solidarity and resistance; members utilized direct action and the labor strike. August 4, the date of the union's establishment, was declared National Bakers' Day by the National Congress of Argentina in 1957.

Activity 

The strike lasted 10 days before succeeding, and inspired the creation of other anarchist labor unions. During the strike, the anarchists in the union renamed many baked goods with names that are still in use today, often alluding to actions against the state or satirizing religion and government. Pastries overall were termed .

In 1901, the bakers held another strike, this time demanding daily pay in place of free meals within the bakery, as well as the addition of one worker to each baking crew. The strike, during which workers used sabotage, was completely successful.

El Obrero Panadero 

From 1894 to 1930, the union disseminated its own publication, titled . The newspaper's chief editor was the union's founder, Ettore Mattei.

See also 

 Anarchism in Argentina
 Argentine Regional Workers' Federation
 Anarcho-syndicalism
 General strike

References 

Anarcho-syndicalism
Anarchist organisations in Argentina
Trade unions established in the 1880s
Trade unions
Bakers' and confectioners' trade unions
Trade unions in Argentina